Heteroclinus tristis, the sharp-nose weedfish, is a species of clinid native to the coastal waters of southern Australia where it prefers sandy reefs with sparse vegetation.  This species can reach a maximum length of  TL.  This species feed primarily fishes, shrimp and prawns.

References

tristis
Fish described in 1872
Taxa named by Carl Benjamin Klunzinger